The Hon. William Frederick Wyndham (6 April 1763 – 11 February 1828) was an English aristocrat and diplomat.

William Frederick Wyndham was the son of Charles Wyndham, 2nd Earl of Egremont and Hon. Alicia Maria Carpenter, daughter of George Carpenter, 2nd Baron Carpenter and Lady of the Bedchamber to Queen Charlotte. On 21 July 1784 he married Frances Mary Harford, the illegitimate daughter of Frederick Calvert, 6th Baron Baltimore and Hester Whelan. They had three daughters and one son George, who became the 4th Earl of Egremont.

From 1794 to 1814, Wyndham was appointed the English Ambassador to Tuscany. Lady Holland recorded surprise at the appointment:

He married a second time to Julia de Smorzewske, Countess de Spyterki. Arthur, apparently a son from this marriage, became a Colonel in the Madras Army.

References

External links
https://www.nationalarchives.gov.uk/nra/searches/subjectView.asp?ID=P31396
Archival material relating to William Frederick Wyndham listed at the UK National Archives

1763 births
1828 deaths
British diplomats
Younger sons of earls
William Frederick